Sander De Pestel (born 11 October 1998) is a Belgian professional racing cyclist, who currently rides for UCI ProTeam .

Major results

2015
 2nd Overall Sint-Martinusprijs Kontich
1st Young rider classification
1st Stage 2
 2nd Omloop Het Nieuwsblad Juniors
 4th Overall Keizer der Juniores
2016
 1st  Road race, National Junior Road Championships
 1st Omloop Het Nieuwsblad Juniors
2017
 1st Overall Ronde van Oost-Vlaanderen
1st Stage 2
 1st Stage 1 (TTT) Okolo Jižních Čech
2018
 1st Stage 1 (TTT) Okolo Jižních Čech
 9th De Kustpijl
 10th Grand Prix des Marbriers
2019
 1st Overall Olympia's Tour
 1st Wingene Koers
 2nd Overall Tour de Namur
1st Stage 4
 3rd Overall Ronde van Oost-Vlaanderen
 6th Grand Prix de la ville de Nogent-sur-Oise

References

External links
 

1998 births
Living people
Belgian male cyclists
Sportspeople from Sint-Niklaas
Cyclists from East Flanders